Żabówko  is a village in the administrative district of Gmina Nowogard, within Goleniów County, West Pomeranian Voivodeship, in north-western Poland.

See also 

 History of Pomerania

References

Villages in Goleniów County